Bhanu Kapil (born 1968) is a British-born poet and author of Indian descent. She is best known for her books The Vertical Interrogation of Strangers (2001), Incubation: A Space for Monsters (2006), and Ban en Banlieue (2015).

In 2020, Kapil won one of eight Windham-Campbell Literature Prizes.

Personal life and education 
Kapil was born in 1968 outside of London to Indian parents. In 1990, she moved to the United States, then returned to England in 2019. She presently spends her time in both the United Kingdom and the United States.

Kapil received a Bachelor of Arts degree from Loughborough University and a Master of Arts degree in English Literature from the State University of New York.

Career 
Kapil's first book, The Vertical Interrogation of Strangers, was written in the late 1990s. She has cited Salman Rushdie's 1980 Booker Prize win as a formative experience for her, saying "Perhaps then, for the first time, I understood that someone like me: could. Could look like me and write." In early 2015, The Believer held a round-table discussion of her work over the course of three days.

Kapil's work can be difficult to classify, occupying a space between poetry and fiction. 2009's Humanimal: A Project for Future Children took its inspiration from the nonfiction account of Amala and Kamala, two girls found "living with wolves in colonial Bengal."  Douglas A. Martin has described Incubation: A Space For Monsters as "a feminist, post-colonial On the Road." Kapil also contributed the introduction to Amina Cain's short story collection I Go To Some Hollow. Her creative work also encompasses performance art and her public readings sometimes blur the line between a traditional reading and performance. Her poetry appeared in a collection edited by Brian Droitcour that was produced as part of the New Museum's 2015 Triennial.

Aside from writing, Kapil has taught at Naropa University, as well as in Goddard College’s MFA program. She has also contributed and co-taught in the Master's in Leadership for Sustainability program at the University of Vermont.

In 2019, Kapil received a year-long fellowship  at the University of Cambridge; after the fellowship, she remained as an artist by-fellow at Churchill College. In 2022, she was elected as a Fellow of the Royal Society of Literature.

Awards and honours 
Incubation: A Space for Monsters was a Small Press Distribution best-seller. Ban en Banlieue was named one of Time Out New York's most anticipated books of early 2015.

In 2019, Kapil received the Judith E. Wilson Poetry Fellowship from the University of Cambridge.

In March 2020 Kapil was awarded one of eight Windham-Campbell Literature Prizes. In January 2021, she was awarded the 2020 T. S Eliot Poetry Prize for How to Wash a Heart. She has also received the Cholmondeley Award from the Society of Authors.

Publications

Books 
 The Vertical Interrogation of Strangers, Kelsey Street Press, 2001, 
 Incubation: A Space for Monsters, Leon Works, 2006, 
 Humanimal: A Project for Future Children, Kelsey Street Press, 2009, 
 Schizophrene, Nightboat Books, 2011, 
 Ban en Banlieue, Nightboat Books, 2015, 
 entre-Ban, Vallum, 2017, 
 How to Wash a Heart, Liverpool University Press, 2020,

Chapbooks 

 Autobiography of a Cyborg, Leroy, 2000.
 Water Damage: A Map of Three Black Days, Corollary Press, 2008.
 Treinte Ban: A psychiatric handbook to accompany a work undone, New Herring Press, 2014.

References

External links 

 Review of How to Wash a Heart in The Georgia Review

1968 births
Living people
American women writers of Indian descent
Naropa University faculty
21st-century American poets
21st-century American women writers
American women poets
American women academics
Fellows of Churchill College, Cambridge
Alumni of Loughborough University
State University of New York alumni